Hoang Tich Chu may refer to:

 Hoàng Tích Chu (1897–1933) Vietnamese journalist
 Hoàng Tích Chù (1912–2003) Vietnamese painter